Centemopsis kirkii is a species of flowering plant in the genus Centemopsis. It is an annual herb reaching heights of 15–100 cm. It tends to have red inflorescences. It can be found in East Africa.

References 

Amaranthaceae